The 1963 Rice Owls football team represented Rice University during the 1963 NCAA University Division football season. In its 24th season under head coach Jess Neely, the team compiled a 6–4 record and outscored opponents by a total of 145 to 114. The team played its home games at Rice Stadium in Houston.

The team's statistical leaders included Walter McReynolds with 728 passing yards, Paul Piper with 475 rushing yards, and John Sylvester with 251 receiving yards. Two Rice players were selected by the Associated Press (AP) and/or United Press International (UPI) as first-team players on the 1963 All-Southwest Conference football team: center Malcolm Walker (AP-1, UPI-1); and guard Johnny Nichols (AP-1).

Schedule

References

Rice
Rice Owls football seasons
Rice Owls football